Ranieri, Count Di Campello (21 September 1908 – 29 May 1959) was an Italian equestrian. He competed in two events at the 1936 Summer Olympics.

References

External links
 

1908 births
1959 deaths
Italian male equestrians
Olympic equestrians of Italy
Equestrians at the 1936 Summer Olympics
Sportspeople from the Province of Perugia